Lucy Cannon ( Grant; October 22, 1880 – May 7, 1966) was the fourth general president of the Young Women organization of the Church of Jesus Christ of Latter-day Saints (LDS Church) from 1937 to 1948. She was a member of the general presidency of the Young Women from 1923 to 1948, serving as a counselor to two presidents.

Biography
Lucy Grant was born in Salt Lake City, Utah Territory to Lucy Stringham and LDS Church apostle Heber J. Grant. She served as a church missionary in the Western States Mission of the church in 1901. In 1902, Grant married George J. Cannon.

In 1923, Cannon was asked to succeed Mae Taylor Nystrom as the second counselor to Martha Horne Tingey, the general president of what was then called the Young Ladies' Mutual Improvement Association. In 1929, when Ruth May Fox succeeded Tingey, Cannon was asked to be her first counselor. Cannon served in this capacity until 1929, when Fox was released and Cannon was selected by her father, who was President of the Church, to be the fourth general president of what had been renamed the Young Women's Mutual Improvement Association. Cannon served until 1948, when she was succeeded by Bertha Stone Reeder.

Cannon and her husband were the parents of seven children. Their son George I. Cannon was a general authority of the church from 1986 to 1991. Lucy Grant Cannon died in Salt Lake City.

References
Joyce O. Evans et al. (1970). A Century of Sisterhood, 1869-1969 (Salt Lake City: Deseret Book)
Marba C. Josephson (1956). History of YWMIA (Salt Lake City: Deseret Book)

Jean Cannon Willis Papers. MSS 2216; 20th Century Western and Mormon Manuscripts; L. Tom Perry Special Collections, Harold B. Lee Library, Brigham Young University.

1880 births
1966 deaths
20th-century Mormon missionaries
American Mormon missionaries in the United States
Burials at Salt Lake City Cemetery
Cannon family
Counselors in the General Presidency of the Young Women (organization)
Female Mormon missionaries
General Presidents of the Young Women (organization)
People from Salt Lake City
People of Utah Territory
American leaders of the Church of Jesus Christ of Latter-day Saints
Latter Day Saints from Utah